Alderaan is a fictional planet featured in the Star Wars franchise. It is blue-green in appearance, depicted as a terrestrial planet with humanoid inhabitants, and characterized by a peaceful culture. It is the home planet of Princess Leia Organa, one of the lead characters in the film series, as well as former Rebel shock trooper Cara Dune. In the original 1977 film, Alderaan is destroyed by the Death Star's superlaser.

Depiction
Early drafts of the Star Wars story include references to at least two planets which later evolved into the concept of Alderaan. Star Wars author George Lucas included a planet called Alderaan in early treatments; in The Star Wars (1973), Alderaan is a city-planet and the capital planet of the galaxy (prefiguring the planet Coruscant which later featured in the films). The draft script opens with a scene in which an "eerie blue-green" planet called Aquilae is threatened by an armed space fortress.

In Lucas's 1975 draft, Adventures of the Starkiller as taken from the Journal of the Whills, Saga I: The Star Wars, the capital planet of Alderaan is described as a floating city in the clouds, "suspended in a sea of cirrus methane". A planet described in Lucas's draft script as being "under siege by the Imperial Legions of Alderaan" and which is later destroyed is named as Ogana Major. Early sketches commissioned by Lucas from conceptual illustrator Ralph McQuarrie show a design which very closely resembles Cloud City, as featured in the later sequel, The Empire Strikes Back. In Lucas's third draft, the Imperial City of Alderaan has become the home world of the Sith Lords, and Darth Vader holds Princess Leia captive here. Lucas continued to hone his script, aided by screenwriters Willard Huyck and Gloria Katz; names of planets and characters were revised and the narrative was improved, and by the fourth draft, scenes on the Imperial capital planet had been moved to a space station called the Death Star and the peaceful world destroyed by the Empire had taken the name Alderaan.

The on-screen depictions of Alderaan in the Star Wars films are scant; the distant planet is seen momentarily in Star Wars (1977) prior to its destruction, and in Revenge of the Sith (2005) a short scene shows a city amid a snow-covered, mountainous landscape.

Film

Alderaan was originally featured in the first film, Star Wars, released in 1977. The opening scene depicts the capture of a small spaceship from Alderaan, the Tantive IV, by the Galactic Empire, and introduces the character of Princess Leia Organa, a princess of the Royal House of Alderaan who is played by Carrie Fisher.

Alderaan appears in a later scene in the film, but is only shown on-screen in a distant view from space as the Empire's gigantic space station, the Death Star, moves into orbit around the planet. The battle station's commander, the Grand Moff Tarkin (Peter Cushing) orders the Death Star's superweapon to be fired at the planet as both a test of the superlaser at full power and as a message to the rest of the galaxy that the price of any type of resistance was extermination. Alderaan explodes instantly in a ball of fire. It is later shown that the shattered planet has been reduced to a cloud of asteroids as the Millennium Falcon spaceship attempts to visit the planet.

The destruction of Alderaan meant that it was not depicted in subsequent Star Wars films until the series of prequel films was produced. The planet made its first on-screen appearance since 1977 in Episode III: Revenge of the Sith (2005), appearing briefly at the end of the film. The adoptive father of Princess Leia, Bail Organa (Jimmy Smits) is seen piloting a starship to the planet's surface, which is shown as a mountainous, alpine region covered in snow. Landing his ship in a citadel among the mountains, he brings the newborn Princess Leia into his royal palace. The backdrop for these scenes was created by compositing landscape footage of Grindelwald in Switzerland with CGI images of the city.

The planet is not featured in the 2016 film Rogue One, but the character Bail Organa makes an appearance, stating that he will return to Alderaan to wait for his daughter, Leia, to bring the Jedi Master Obi-Wan Kenobi. This precedes the narrative of the 1977 film, A New Hope. He dies when the Death Star destroys the planet.

Television
In an episode of the animated television series Star Wars: The Clone Wars entitled "Assassin", Ahsoka Tano has premonitions of Padmé's death on Alderaan.

The mercenary Carasynthia "Cara" Dune, in The Mandalorian, is a former Republic Shock Trooper from Alderaan, according to Moff Gideon, which she later confirms.

The planet appeared in the first and sixth episodes of the streaming series Obi-Wan Kenobi, in scenes depicting the Organa's residence and its surroundings.

Comics
The comic series Star Wars: Princess Leia (2015) deals with Princess Leia and Evaan Verlaine (a female rebel pilot also native from Alderaan), rescuing survivors from Alderaan's destruction. It also features a brief flashback to Leia's childhood on the planet and her relationship with her adoptive father Senator Bail Organa.

In Star Wars #33 (2017), Leia tells Luke that sometimes she can see Alderaan among the stars as, from certain perspectives in the galaxy, its light has not ceased to emit.

Legends
Alderaan is mentioned frequently and also serves as a location in several works in the Star Wars Expanded Universe, the collection of books, comics and other material considered outside official canon, now branded Star Wars Legends. In various stories, Alderaan is presented as the home of the characters Tycho Celchu, and of Ulic Qel Droma who fought in the Great Sith War in 4000 BBY.

Radio drama
The 1981 NPR/BBC  radio drama adaptation of Star Wars features scenes set on Alderaan, in which Princess Leia discusses her mission to acquire the Death Star plans from agents of the Rebel Alliance with her father, Bail Organa (Prestor Organa). In a later scene, she is confronted by the Imperial commander Lord Tion and accused of treason. It is established that Alderaan has a strict policy against weapons.

Novels
In Michael A. Stackpole's 1998 novel, I, Jedi, Alderaan features as the sanctuary of the Caamasi when their home world of Caamas is devastated by the Galactic Empire.

Alderaan is featured in a 1991 role-playing game, Graveyard of Alderaan (part of Star Wars: The Roleplaying Game). It describes how, after the Clone Wars, Alderaan's massive war machine was dismantled, and the weapons were placed aboard an armory warship called Another Chance. The ship was programmed to continually jump through hyperspace until called home by the Alderanian Council. Bill Slavicsek, who wrote the game's sourcebook, later drew from it for his edition of A Guide to the Star Wars Universe.

Comics
In the Dark Horse comic Dark Empire (1991–1992), New Alderaan is a Rebel Alliance colony planet populated by Alderaanians who were off-world when Alderaan was destroyed. Mon Mothma's daughter lives there.

Description 

In Alan Dean Foster's 1976 novelization of the original film, Alderaan is described as a "small green gem of a world".
The planet appears more substantially in Star Wars reference guides to fictional locations. According to Kevin J. Anderson's The Illustrated Star Wars Universe (1995) and Wallace, Kolins and McKinney's Star Wars: The Essential Guide to Planets and Moons (1998), Alderaan is covered by wild grasslands, plains, forests and mountain ranges. The planet has no ocean, but has a semi-frozen polar sea, and thousands of lakes and rivers. It is rich in biodiversity, populated by a wide variety of flora and fauna, such as the nerf and the thranta.

Human life on the planet is evidenced by a number of cities, built to harmonize with the natural environment such as on canyon walls, on stilts along the shoreline or under the polar ice. The capital city, Aldera, has been built on a small island in the center of a caldera. The Alderaanian people value arts and education highly, and place high importance on their participation in the Galactic (later Imperial) Senate and the promotion of peace through demilitarization. The largely democratic society is formed as hereditary constitutional monarchy, ruled by the King or Queen of Alderaan from the Royal House of Antilles and later, due to marriage, the House of Organa.  The planetary government is the High Council of Alderaan, presided over by a First Chairman and Viceroy.

Cultural analysis
The destruction of Alderaan is considered by some as an artistic depiction of the danger of nuclear weapons during the Cold War and some claim it is used as a  example of inadequate political and military action leading to negative effects.

See also
 List of Star Wars planets and moons
 Star Wars: The Han Solo Trilogy, Volume 3 – Rebel Dawn
 Star Wars: X-Wing, Book 4 – The Bacta War

References
Footnotes

Citations

Sources

Further reading 
 Star Wars: Roleplaying Game – Coruscant and the Core Worlds, hardcover 2003, by Craig R. Carey, Chris Doyle, Jason Fry, Paul Sudlow, John Terra, Daniel Wallace,

External links 
 
 

Star Wars planets
Fictional destroyed planets
Fictional terrestrial planets
Fictional elements introduced in 1977

de:Orte aus Star Wars#Alderaan